Jason Yarde (born 1970) is an English jazz saxophonist, composer, arranger, producer and music director. He has worked with a wide range of artists and music ensembles, including Denys Baptiste, The Blind Boys Of Alabama, McCoy Tyner, Andrew Hill, Jack DeJohnette, Hugh Masekela and the London Symphony Orchestra.

Biography
Yarde was born in 1970 in Beckenham, England, to Guyanese parents. While still a teenager at school, he began playing alto and soprano saxophone with the Jazz Warriors, and went on to become their music director. Yarde has also been associated with Tomorrow's Warriors since it was started.

Yarde studied at Middlesex University, obtaining a BA (Hons) in Performance Arts; the degree incorporated a year at William Paterson College, New Jersey, studying orchestration, studio engineering, jazz performance and saxophone under Joe Lovano, Gary Smulyan and Steve Wilson. 

In 2007, Yarde's work All Souls Seek Joy was premiered by Hugh Masekela and the London Symphony Orchestra at the Barbican Centre. His BBC Proms composition Rhythm and Other Fascinations, for piano trio and the BBC Concert Orchestra, won the inaugural BASCA award for contemporary Jazz Composition in 2009.

References

1970 births
Living people
20th-century British male musicians
20th-century saxophonists
21st-century British male musicians
21st-century saxophonists
Alumni of Middlesex University
Black British musicians
English jazz composers
English male composers
English people of Guyanese descent